Jilin Yatai Group Company Limited is a private conglomerate enterprise in Changchun, Jilin, China. It was established in 1993 and it was listed on the Shanghai Stock Exchange in 1995. Its core businesses include property development, cement manufacturing and securities. Others include coal mining, pharmaceuticals and trading. They are the founders and current owners of Chinese Super League club Changchun Yatai F.C.

References

External links
Jilin Yatai Group Company Limited

Conglomerate companies of China
Companies based in Changchun
Chinese companies established in 1993
Conglomerate companies established in 1993
Companies listed on the Shanghai Stock Exchange